, (born 1 April 1967, in Kyoto) is a former Japanese rugby union footballer. He played as a fullback.

Hosokawa had only 10 caps for Japan, from 1990 to 1993, but he nevertheless scored 3 tries, 14 conversions, 24 penalties and 1 drop goal, in an aggregate of 115 points. His first match was a 28-16 win over Tonga, at 8 April 1990, in Tokyo, and his last match was a 45-20 loss to Argentina, at 22 May 1993, in Buenos Aires.

Hosokawa was the top scorer for Japan at the 1991 Rugby World Cup finals, playing in all the three matches, where he scored 1 try, 8 conversions, 2 penalties and 1 drop goal, 29 points in aggregate.

External links
Takahiro Hosokawa International Statistics

1967 births
Living people
Japanese rugby union players
Rugby union fullbacks
Kobelco Kobe Steelers players
Japan international rugby union players